Docmo or Damot is a town in Werder Zone of the Somali Region in Ethiopia. The exact district or woreda of Docmo is Bookh also called Boh. The locality is often incorrectly transliterated in various ways, including Damot by Europeans, or as Domo or Domco by the Somalis. Docmo is adjacent to the nearby locality of Las Suban, which is slightly north. It is located a few miles southwest of the border of Dharkeyn Genyo. The first stand-off between the main Darwiish army and the British army occurred in June 1901 in the town of Domco after the Darwiish army retreated from Baran in Sool province, formerly known as Nugaal territory and made Docmo their headquarters with 3,000 men being stationed there.

References

Populated places in the Somali Region
Border crossings of the Darawiish